James de Terte (born 16 January 1983) is a New Zealand cricketer. He played in four first-class matches for Central Districts from 2008 to 2012.

See also
 List of Central Districts representative cricketers

References

External links
 

1983 births
Living people
New Zealand cricketers
Central Districts cricketers
Cricketers from Sydney